Melanella martyni is a species of sea snail, a marine gastropod mollusk in the family Eulimidae.

References

 Jordan H. K. (1895). On some new species of British Mollusca, from the "Triton" Expedition, with a list of other species new to the Faroe Channel.. Proceedings of the Malacological Society of London 1: 264-269
 Gofas, S.; Le Renard, J.; Bouchet, P. (2001). Mollusca. in: Costello, M.J. et al. (eds), European Register of Marine Species: a check-list of the marine species in Europe and a bibliography of guides to their identification. Patrimoines Naturels. 50: 180-213.

External links
 To World Register of Marine Species

martynjordani
Gastropods described in 1895